Barona Resort and Casino is an Indian casino on the Barona Indian Reservation located in Lakeside, in San Diego County in California. It is owned and operated by the Barona Group of Capitan Grande Band of Mission Indians.

Casino 
Barona offers guests over 75 table games including blackjack, poker, Pai gow poker, Mississippi Stud, California-style craps (using playing cards to determine the outcome of a roll rather than only dice, as dice-only games are not allowed in California tribal casinos), roulette and over 2,500 slot and video poker machines. Barona is located between Lakeside and Ramona, 30 miles northeast of downtown San Diego.

The minimum gambling age at Barona Casino is 18. While the legal age for gambling in California is also 18, many tribal casinos in California set an age limit of 21 in order to comply with their alcohol license. 

Unlike most casinos, Barona does not offer alcoholic beverages on the casino floor. It does offer alcoholic beverages in the Barona Oaks Steakhouse, Italian Cucina and the plaza restaurant. According to the leaders of Barona Casino, the winding and hilly nature of Wildcat Canyon Road, which serves as the main access route into Barona Indian Reservation, is a primary factor that led to this decision.

References

External links 
 Barona Resort and Casino

Kumeyaay
Casinos in San Diego County, California
Native American casinos
1999 establishments in California